Megleno-Romanian (known as  by its speakers and Megleno-Romanian or Meglenitic and sometimes Moglenitic or Meglinitic by linguists) is a Balkan Romance language, similar to Aromanian. It is spoken by the Megleno-Romanians in a few villages in the Moglena region that spans the border between the Greek region of Macedonia and North Macedonia. It is also spoken by emigrants from these villages and their descendants in Romania, in Turkey by a small Muslim group, and in Serbia. It is considered an endangered language.

Classification

Megleno-Romanian is a member of the family of Romance languages. More specifically, it is an Eastern Romance language, a language formed after the retreat of the Roman Empire from the Balkans. Due to the fact that it is spoken by very few people and because of its similarities with the Aromanian, modern Romanian and Istro-Romanian languages, some linguists consider it to be an intermediary between Romanian and Aromanian, often being considered either a dialect of Romanian, a dialect of Aromanian, or an independent language. It is closer to standard Romanian than the Aromanian language, suggesting that it split from Common Romanian later than Aromanian. Megleno-Romanian has been strongly influenced by the neighbouring South Slavic varieties.

Name
The term Megleno-Romanian has been used by linguists (mainly Romanian), who noticed the similarity to the Romanian language. The Megleno-Romanians identify themselves as Vlahi (see Etymology of Vlach for more on this term).

Geographical distribution
Megleno-Romanian is spoken in several villages in the Pella and Kilkis regional units of Macedonia, Greece, as well as in a handful of villages across the border in North Macedonia. In one village, Huma, the language is still spoken by most inhabitants. Some people of Megleno-Romanian origin who live in the cities of Gevgelija and Skopje have preserved their native language. After World War I, some Megleno-Romanians moved to Romania, in Southern Dobruja, but were moved to the village of Cerna in Tulcea County (Northern Dobruja) after the population exchange between Bulgaria and Romania. In Cerna, about 1,200 people continue to speak Megleno-Romanian. In 1940, about 30 families moved from Cerna to the Banat region of Romania in the villages of Variaș, Biled and Jimbolia. Some speakers who identified as Muslim, from the village of Nânti (Nótia), were moved to Turkey from Greece as part of the population exchange between them of the 1920s. Some also live in Serbia, specially in the village of Gudurica.

Phonology

Consonants 

 Sounds [] as well as [, ] can also occur from Greek borrowings.

Vowels 

Megleno-Romanian has some unique phonetic characteristics, not found in the other Eastern Romance languages:
 long vowels: ā, ē, ī, ǭ, ō, ū
 ă, â → o, a: câmp → comp (field), mânc → mānanc (I eat)
 unstressed initial a disappears: eram → ram (I was), aveam →  (We had ), aduc → duc (I bring)

Vocabulary

Much of the vocabulary is of Latin origin and much of its phonetics and semantics is shared with Aromanian and Romanian: (n.b.: MR=Megleno-Romanian, DR=Daco-Romanian, i.e. Romanian)

 basilica > MR bisearică, DR biserică (church, originally "basilica")
 lumen > MR lumi, DR lume (world, originally "light")
 monumentum > MR murmint, DR mormânt (grave, originally "monument")
 strigis > MR strig, DR strig (I yell, originally "owl")
 draco > MR drac, DR drac (devil, originally "dragon")

Megleno-Romanian also contains some words that have cognates with Albanian. These words are present in Daco-Romanian too:

 MR brad; DR brad; cf. Alb. bredh (fir tree)
 MR monz; DR mânz; cf. Alb. mës (colt)
 MR bucuros; DR bucuros; (happy) cf. Alb bukur (beautiful)

There are also some words which are of Slavic origin and which can be found in all the Eastern Romance languages:

 MR trup; DR trup (body); cf. Sl. trupŭ
 MR stăpon; DR stăpân (master); cf. Old Slavic. stopanŭ, today's Bulgarian stopanin and Macedonian stopan

There are a number of Byzantine and Modern Greek words, several dozens of which are also found in Daco-Romanian (Romanian language) and Aromanian and about 80 words that were borrowed via Macedonian and Bulgarian languages and other languages of the Balkans. Prior to the creation of the modern state of Greece, Megleno-Romanian borrowed very few words directly from Greek.

 Gr. prósfatos > MR proaspit; DR proaspăt (fresh)
 Gr. keramídi > MR chirămidă; DR cărămidă (brick)
 Gr. lemoni > MR limonă, via Bulg. limon (lemon); cf. DR lămâie

The most important influence on Megleno-Romanian was the East South Slavic languages, this influence being more profound than that exerted by Greek on Aromanian. Most Slavic terms are of Macedonian and Bulgarian origins. The linguist Theodor Capidan argued that the words borrowed show some phonetic features of the Bulgarian language dialect spoken in the Rhodope Mountains. There are many instances where basic words of Latin origin that can still be found in Daco-Romanian and Aromanian were replaced by Slavic words. In some cases, standard Romanian also independently borrowed the same word.

 Bulgarian (Slavic) drob > MR drob
 Bulgarian neviasta > MR niveastă (bride)
 Bulgarian gora > MR goră (forest)

See also  
 Istro-Romanian language 
 Substrate in Romanian 
 Balkan sprachbund
 Origin of the Romanians
 Thraco-Roman 
 Daco-Roman 
 Romance languages 
 Legacy of the Roman Empire

References

Further reading

Capidan, Theodor, Meglenoromânii
vol. I: Istoria și graiul lor [Their history and speech], București, Cultura Națională, 1925;
vol. II: Literatura populară la meglenoromâni [Popular literature of the Megleno-Romanians], București, Cultura Națională / Academia Română, Studii și Cercetări VII, 1928;
vol. III: Dicționar meglenoromân [Megleno-Romanian dictionary], București, Cultura Națională / Academia Română, Studii și Cercetări XXV, 1935

External links

Megleno-Romanii, by Dr. Emil Tarcovnicu 
Megleno-Romanian Swadesh list of basic vocabulary words (from Wiktionary's Swadesh list appendix)
Asterios Koukoudis, Studies on the Vlachs

Megleno-Romanian language
Eastern Romance languages
Languages of Greece
Languages of North Macedonia
Languages of Romania
Languages of Serbia
Languages of Turkey
Endangered Romance languages